The Cantata Singers and Ensemble is a choir and orchestral ensemble located in Boston, Massachusetts. Founded in 1964 to perform and preserve the cantatas of Johann Sebastian Bach (a body of works largely unknown in Boston at that time), the group has since expanded its scope to include repertoire from the 17th century to the present day. Their performances have included semi-staged operas and a series of seasons centered on a single composer – Kurt Weill, Benjamin Britten, Heinrich Schütz, and Ralph Vaughan Williams.

Music Directors

Commissioned Works

References

External links
Official website

Choirs in Massachusetts
American instrumental musical groups
Culture of Boston
Musical groups from Boston
Music organizations based in the United States
Musical groups established in 1964